This is a list of cleaning products and agents. Cleaning agents are substances (usually liquids, powders, sprays, or granules) used to remove dirt, including dust, stains, bad smells, and clutter on surfaces. Purposes of cleaning agents include health, beauty, removing offensive odor, and avoiding the spread of dirt and contaminants to oneself and others.

Cleaning products

 Air freshener
 Automatic deodorizer dispenser
 Ajax (cleaning product)
 Arm & Hammer (brand)
 Bar Keepers Friend
 Bath brick – patented in 1823, it was a predecessor of the scouring pad used for cleaning and polishing
 Behold
 Bio Pac Inc
 Biological detergent
 Blanco (compound)
 Bluing (fabric)
 Bon Ami
 Borax
 Brillo Pad
 Bronze wool
 2-Butoxyethanol
 Calcium Lime Rust
 Cif
 Cleret Glass Cleaner
 Colour Catcher
 Comet (cleanser)
 Denture cleaner
 Descaling agent
 Detergent
 Didi Seven
 Dishwashing liquid
 Dispensing ball
 Disposable towel
 Dolly blue
 Domestos
 Donkey stone
 Drano
 Dryer ball
 Dust-Off
 Ecover
 Endust
 Fabric softener
 Fairy (brand)
 Falcon Safety Products
 Bon Ami Company
 Febreze
 Finish (detergent)
 Formula 409
 Frosch USA
 Gas duster
 Glade (brand)
 Guar hydroxypropyltrimonium chloride
 Hard-surface cleaner – a category of cleaning agents comprising mainly aqueous solutions of specialty chemicals
 Hillyard, Inc.
 Laundry ball
 Lestoil – a heavy-duty multi-purpose cleanser product
 Liquid-Plumr
 Monkey Brand – a soap introduced in the 1880s as a household scouring and polishing soap, in cake/bar form
 Mr Sheen
 Mrs. Stewart's Bluing – a brand of fabric bluing agent first marketed in 1883 that whitens fabrics with a proprietary blue dye, primarily made of blue iron powder
 Murphy Oil Soap
 OxiClean
 Paper towel
 Phisoderm
 Piranha solution
 Ravi-de-Tulip
 ReNu
 Retr0bright
 Rozalex
 Rubbing alcohol
 Seventh Generation Inc.
 Saddle soap
 Scotch-Brite
 Scouring pad
 Shake n' Vac
 Shoe polish
 Esquire Shoe Polish
 Kiwi (shoe polish)
 Shinola
 Wren's Super Wax Shoe Polish
 Simple Green
 Snuggle
 S.O.S Soap Pad
 Soap
 Soap on a Rope (product)
 Soap substitute
 Sodium bisulfate
 Sodium hydroxide
 Sodium polycarboxylate
 Spic and Span
 Spiffits
 Sponge (material)
 Steel wool
 Surf (detergent)
 Swarfega – a brand of heavy-duty hand cleaner
 Tawashi
 Toilet cleaner
 Sani Flush
 Toilet Duck
 Toilet rim block
 Urinal deodorizer block
 V-Bor
 Vegetable wash
 Vim (cleaning product)
 Yucca glauca

Brands

 20 Mule Team Borax
 2000 Flushes
 Ariel (detergent)
 Bosisto's
 Bounty (brand)
 Brasso
 Calgon
 Cheer (brand)
 Chore Boy
 Cillit Bang
 Clorox
 Armor All
 Formula 409
 Lestoil
 Liquid-Plumr
 Pine-Sol
 S.O.S Soap Pad
 Comfort (fabric softener)
 Dawn (brand)
 Downy
 Fels-Naptha
 Frosch USA
 
 Glass Plus
 Gold Dust washing powder
 Harpic
 Joy (dishwashing liquid)
 Lysol
 Leifheit
 Mr Muscle
 Mr Sheen
 Mr. Clean
 Palmolive (brand)
 Pledge (brand)
 Purell
 Purex (laundry detergent)
 Ravi-de-Tulip
 Rinso
 Scrub Daddy
 Scrubbing Bubbles
 Suavitel
 Swiffer
 Tide (brand)
 Ty-D-Bol
 Vanish (brand)
 Vileda
 Windex
 Woolite

Disinfectants

Disinfectants are antimicrobial agents that are applied to the surface of non-living objects to destroy microorganisms that are living on the objects.

 Air sanitizer 
 Antimicrobial copper-alloy touch surfaces 
 Barbicide 
 Barium borate 
 BCDMH 
 Behentrimonium chloride 
 Benzethonium chloride 
 Benzododecinium bromide 
 Bleach 
 Bromine monochloride 
 Calcium oxide 
 Calcium peroxide 
 Carbethopendecinium bromide 
 Carbol fuchsin 
 Carbolic soap 
 Chlorhexidine 
 Chlorine dioxide 
 2-Chlorophenol 
 Creolin 
 Cresolene 
 Crystal violet 
 DBDMH 
 Diazolidinyl urea 
 Electrolysed water 
 Ethanol 
 Eucalyptus oil 
 Fuchsine 
 Germicidal lamp 
 Gluma 
 Glutaraldehyde 
 Hand sanitizer 
 Hexachlorocyclohexa-2,5-dien-1-one 
 Hydrogen peroxide 
 Hypochlorous acid 
 Hypomide 
 Imidazolidinyl urea 
 Iodophor 
 Isopropyl alcohol 
 Jeyes Fluid – a brand of disinfectant fluid
 Lapyrium 
 Lithium hypochlorite 
 Lugol's iodine 
 Magnesium monoperoxyphthalate 
 Methyl violet 
 Milton sterilizing fluid 
 NAV- system 
 Nitromersol 
 Ozone 
 Peracetic acid 
 Phenols 
 Pine oil 
 Polyaminopropyl biguanide 
 Potassium hypochlorite 
 Potassium permanganate 
 Povidone-iodine 
 Pseudomonas aeruginosa 
 Quaternary ammonium cation 
 Ravi-de-Tulip
 Rideal–Walker coefficient 
 Sodium dichloroisocyanurate 
 Sodium hypochlorite 
 Sodium metabisulfite 
 Sodium permanganate 
 Thymol 
 Tincture of iodine 
 2,4,6-Trichlorophenol 
 Vaporized hydrogen peroxide 
 Virkon – a multi-purpose disinfectant product
 Wet wipe

Laundry detergents
Laundry detergent, or washing powder, is a type of detergent (cleaning agent) that is added for cleaning laundry.

 Annette's Perfect Cleanser Company – was a 1930s era firm which manufactured a dry powder which was useful for removing spots and stains from clothing
 Ariel (detergent)
 Biz (detergent)
 Bold (detergent)
 Breeze detergent
 Cheer (brand)
 Cold Power
 Colour Catcher
 Dash (detergent)
 Daz (laundry detergent)
 Didi Seven
 Dreft
 Fresh Start (detergent)
 Gain (detergent)
 Ghari Detergent
 Laundry detergent pod
 Luvil
 Nirma
 Oxydol
 Persil
 Persil Power
 Purex (laundry detergent)
 Rinso
 Sunlight (cleaning product)
 Surf (detergent)
 Surf Excel
 Tide (brand)
 Tolypers
 Wheel (detergent)
 WIN (detergent)
 Wisk – discontinued in 2016
 Woolite

Soaps

In chemistry, a soap is a salt of a fatty acid. Household uses for soaps include washing, bathing, and other types of housekeeping, where soaps act as surfactants, emulsifying oils to enable them to be carried away by water.

 African black soap
 Aleppo soap
 Amphiphile
 Antibacterial soap
 Azul e branco soap
 Bulnesia sarmientoi
 Carbolic soap
 Castile soap
 Cuticura soap
 Glycerin soap
 Gossage
 Hard soap
 Derreck Kayongo
 Lye
 Marseille soap
 Melt and pour
 Nabulsi soap
 Phisoderm
 Popish soap
 Rebatching
 Resin soap
 Saltwater soap
 Shaving soap
 Soap shaker
 Soaper
 Sodium stearate
 Stainless steel soap
 Sugar soap
 Total fatty matter
 Unsaponifiable
 Vegan soap

Soap brands

 Ach. Brito
 Biechele Soap
 Boraxo
 Camay
 Caswell-Massey
 Chandrika (soap)
 Coast (soap)
 Defense Soap
 Dial (soap)
 Dove (toiletries)
 Faso soap
 Fels-Naptha
 Fenjal
 Godrej Consumer Products Limited
 Hamam (soap)
 Imperial Leather
 Irish Spring
 Ivory (soap)
 Joy (dishwashing liquid)
 Kerala Soaps
 L'Amande
 Lano (soap)
 Lava (soap)
 Lever 2000
 Lifebuoy (soap)
 Liril
 Lux (soap)
 Margo (soap)
 Medimix
 Mysore Sandal Soap
 Nivea
 Old Spice
 Palmolive (brand)
 Pears (soap)
 Proraso
 Ravi-de-Tulip
 Rozalex
 Sapolio
 Sebamed
 Shower Shock
 Simple Skincare
 Sunlight (cleaning product)
 Swan Soap
 Swarfega
 Tabac (perfume)
 Wright's Coal Tar Soap
 Zest (brand)

See also

 Automatic soap dispenser
 William E. Corbin – inventor of Nibroc paper towels
 Environmental impact of cleaning agents
 Green cleaning
 International Nomenclature of Cosmetic Ingredients
 List of cleaning companies
 Saponification
 Soap dispenser
 Surfactant
 Terminal cleaning 
 UK Cleaning Products Industry Association

References

Lists of brands